Patrick Stewart Onstad (born January 13, 1968) is a Canadian former professional soccer goalkeeper who serves as the General Manager of the Houston Dynamo. During his career, Onstad played with a variety of clubs in Canada and the United States and was a three-time winner of MLS Cup. He was inducted into the Canadian Soccer Hall of Fame in November 2015.

Youth and college
Onstad began playing organized soccer with the West Point Grey, Marpole United, and Coquitlam Metro-Ford youth soccer clubs. He then went on to tend goal at the University of British Columbia, who he led to three CIAU National Championships. He was also a two-time Academic All-Canadian, and holds degrees in Human Kinetics and Education.

Club career
After graduating, Onstad joined the Vancouver 86ers of the Canadian Soccer League in 1987. From 1988 to 1989, he played for the Winnipeg Fury, also of the CSL. He moved to a third CSL team, the Toronto Blizzard, for 1990 and 1991. Onstad returned to the Fury in 1992, winning both the CSL Championship and the CSL Goalkeeper of the Year Award.

Onstad moved to the APSL in 1994, playing for the Toronto Rockets. After a season with the Rockets, he moved to the Montreal Impact for 1995. In 1996, he played indoor soccer for the Edmonton Drillers of the NPSL. He returned to outdoor soccer in 1997, playing for the Toronto Lynx, again of the A-League.

United States and Scotland
In 1998, Onstad moved to his first American team, the Rochester Raging Rhinos, with whom he won the A-League title, and was also named the league's Goalkeeper of the Year, after allowing only 13 goals in 26 regular season games. Onstad remained with Rochester for 1999, was named All-League second team, and helped the Rhinos become the only minor league team to win the U.S. Open Cup since the foundation of Major League Soccer.

In 1999, Onstad was signed by Dundee United of Scotland for the 1999–2000 and 2000–2001 seasons, but as third-string goal keeper behind Alan Combe and Paul Gallacher, he did not see any playing time with the first team. 

He returned to Rochester in 2001, and although a wrist injury kept him out of action for most of the year, he finished second in the league in goals against the following year.

Major League Soccer
On March 13, 2003, Onstad was signed as a discovery player by the San Jose Earthquakes as a replacement for Joe Cannon. Onstad filled in quite well, helping lead the Earthquakes to their second MLS Cup in three years, and winning the MLS Goalkeeper of the Year Award. He had another excellent year in 2005, supporting the Earthquakes as they went undefeated at home (the first time any team did that in MLS history) and winning the MLS Supporters' Shield, and winning the MLS Goalkeeper of the Year Award for a second time. He was named to the MLS Best XI in both 2003 and 2005.
Along with the rest of his Earthquakes teammates, he moved to Houston for the 2006 season. Onstad played every minute of the regular season for the Dynamo.

After the 2010 MLS season Houston declined Onstad's contract option. He elected to participate in the 2010 MLS Re-Entry Draft, but was not selected in the Re-Entry draft.  Shortly thereafter, Onstad announced his retirement on December 21, 2010.

International career
Onstad played for Canada at the 1987 FIFA World Youth Championship and the 1987 Pan American Games. 

Onstad made his senior debut for the Canadian national team on February 18, 1988, against Bermuda, and played a total of 60 games over a 22-year period for the squad. He represented Canada in 15 FIFA World Cup qualification matches in three unsuccessful World Cup qualifying campaigns. His final official international game was an August 2008 World Cup qualification match against Jamaica. He played a friendly against Argentina on May 24, 2010.

Coaching career
Onstad joined D.C. United as an assistant coach alongside Chad Ashton.
It was announced on February 17, 2011, that Onstad would come out of retirement to play for D.C. due to the injuries to Steve Cronin and Bill Hamid. His contract with D.C. United expired on May 31, 2011, and Onstad returned solely to his duties as an assistant coach. Onstad left D.C. in January 2013.

He joined Toronto FC as Chief Scout and Manager of Football Partnerships. Shortly after the firings of general manager Kevin Payne, and director of team and player operations Earl Cochrane, Onstad left the organization.

On January 10, 2014, he joined Columbus Crew SC as an assistant coach, with head coach Gregg Berhalter stating that "Pat is very professional in how he approaches the game, and he brings versatility to his new role. He has great league experience and a winning pedigree, and those are attributes that attracted us to bringing him onboard." When Gregg Berhalter left Columbus to coach the United States men's national soccer team, Onstad was promoted to technical director by Crew president and general manager Tim Bezbachenko.

On November 1, 2021, Onstad was hired as general manager of the Houston Dynamo.

Honours
Rochester Rhinos
 A-League Championship: 1998, 2001
 A-League Commissioner's Cup: 1998, 1999
 Lamar Hunt U.S. Open Cup: 1999
 Eastern Conference Championship: 1998, 1999
 Northeast Division Champs: 1998, 1999, 2002

San Jose Earthquakes
 Major League Soccer MLS Cup: 2003
 Major League Soccer Supporters Shield: 2005
 Major League Soccer Western Conference Championship: 2003
 Major League Soccer Western Conference Championship: (Regular Season) 2003, 2005

Houston Dynamo
 Major League Soccer MLS Cup: 2006, 2007
 Major League Soccer Western Conference Championship: 2006, 2007

Canada
 CONCACAF Gold Cup: 2000

Canada U20
 CONCACAF U-20 Championship: 1986

Individual
 MLS Goalkeeper of the Year: 2003, 2005
 MLS Best XI: 2003, 2005
 Canadian Player of the Year: 2003
 A-League Goalkeeper of the Year: 1998
 A-League: First Team: 1998, Second Team 1999
 Rochester Rhinos Hall of Fame: 2012
 Canadian Soccer Hall of Fame: 2015

References

External links
 / Canada Soccer Hall of Fame
 
 

1968 births
Living people
1993 CONCACAF Gold Cup players
2000 CONCACAF Gold Cup players
2001 FIFA Confederations Cup players
2003 CONCACAF Gold Cup players
2007 CONCACAF Gold Cup players
American Professional Soccer League players
Canadian expatriate sportspeople in the United States
Canadian expatriate soccer players
Canada men's international soccer players
Canadian soccer players
Canada Soccer Hall of Fame inductees
Canadian Soccer League (1987–1992) players
CONCACAF Gold Cup-winning players
Canadian people of Norwegian descent
D.C. United players
Dundee United F.C. players
Edmonton Drillers (1996–2000) players
Expatriate footballers in Scotland
Expatriate soccer players in the United States
Association football goalkeepers
Houston Dynamo FC players
Major League Soccer players
Major League Soccer All-Stars
Vancouver Whitecaps (1986–2010) players
Montreal Impact (1992–2011) players
National Professional Soccer League (1984–2001) players
Soccer players from Vancouver
Association football player-managers
Rochester New York FC players
San Jose Earthquakes players
Toronto Blizzard (1986–1993) players
Toronto Lynx players
Toronto Rockets players
UBC Thunderbirds soccer players
A-League (1995–2004) players
Winnipeg Fury players
D.C. United non-playing staff
Columbus Crew non-playing staff
Canadian expatriate sportspeople in Scotland
Footballers at the 1987 Pan American Games
Pan American Games competitors for Canada